Manchester Openshaw was a parliamentary constituency centred on the Openshaw district of Manchester.  It returned one Member of Parliament (MP)  to the House of Commons of the Parliament of the United Kingdom.

The constituency was created for the 1955 general election, and abolished for the 1983 general election.

Boundaries
1955–1974: The county borough of Manchester wards of Bradford, Newton Heath and Openshaw, and the urban district of Failsworth.

1974–1983: The county borough of Manchester wards of Bradford and Newton Heath, and the urban district of Failsworth.

Members of Parliament

Election results

Elections in the 1950s

Elections in the 1960s

Elections in the 1970s

References

Openshaw
Constituencies of the Parliament of the United Kingdom established in 1955
Constituencies of the Parliament of the United Kingdom disestablished in 1983